Baymaksky District (Baymaq rayonı) is an administrative and municipal district (raion), one of the fifty-four in the Republic of Bashkortostan, Russia. It is located in the southeast of the republic and borders with Abzelilovsky District in the north, Chelyabinsk Oblast and the territory of the town of republic significance of Sibay in the east, Khaybullinsky District in the south, and with Zilairsky District in the south and west. Its administrative center is the town of Baymak (which is not administratively a part of the district). As of the 2010 Census, the total population of the district was 40,862.

Geography
Main bodies of water in the district include the Sakmara, Tanalyk, and Bolshaya Urtazymka Rivers (with minor tributaries) as well as Lakes Talkas and Kultuban. Mineral reserves in the district include the Sibaysky mine, with one of the largest copper reserves in Russia. The district, being located in the Ural Mountains, feels the effects of the Asian continental air and has a mild climate.

History
The district was established on August 20, 1930.

Administrative and municipal status
Within the framework of administrative divisions, Baymaksky District is one of the fifty-four in the Republic of Bashkortostan. It is divided into twenty-two selsoviets, comprising ninety-one rural localities. The town of Baymak serves as its administrative center, despite being incorporated separately as a town of republic significance—an administrative unit with the status equal to that of the districts.

As a municipal division, the district is incorporated as Baymaksky Municipal District, with the town of republic significance of Baymak being incorporated within it as Baymak Urban Settlement. Its twenty-two selsoviets are incorporated as twenty-two rural settlements within the municipal district. The town of Baymak serves as the administrative center of the municipal district as well.

Towns and settlements
2nd Turkemenevo

References

Notes

Sources

Districts of Bashkortostan
States and territories established in 1930